David Burke (born 15 December 1963) is an Irish retired hurler who played as a goalkeeper for the Kilkenny and Wexford senior teams.

Born in Urlingford, County Kilkenny, Burke first played competitive hurling during his schooling at Johnstown Vocational School. He arrived on the inter-county scene at the age of seventeen when he first linked up with the Kilkenny minor team, before later joining the under-21 and junior sides. He made his senior debut during the 1984-85 National Hurling League. Burke enjoyed a five-year career with Kilkenny before later joining the Wexford senior team. He won one Leinster medal and one National Hurling League medal as a non-playing substitute.

At club level Burke is a one-time championship medallist in the intermediate grade with Mooncoin. He began his career with Emeralds before later joining Rathgarogue-Cushinstown.

Throughout his career Burke made a combined total of six championship appearances. He retired from inter-county hurling following the conclusion of the 1992 championship.

Honours

Team

Johnstown Vocational School
All-Ireland Vocational Schools Senior Hurling Championship (1): 1982
Leinster Vocational Schools Senior Hurling Championship (1): 1982

Mooncoin
Kilkenny Intermediate Hurling Championship (1): 1990

Kilkenny
Leinster Senior Hurling Championship (1): 1987 (sub)
National Hurling League (1): 1989-90 (sub)
All-Ireland Junior Hurling Championship (1): 1990
Leinster Junior Hurling Championship (1): 1990
All-Ireland Under-21 Hurling Championship (1): 1984
Leinster Under-21 Hurling Championship (1): 1984
All-Ireland Minor Hurling Championship (1): 1981
Munster Minor Hurling Championship (1): 1981

References

1981 births
Living people
Emeralds hurlers
Mooncoin hurlers
Rathgarogue-Cushinstown hurlers
Kilkenny inter-county hurlers
Wexford inter-county hurlers
Hurling goalkeepers